Aaron Keith Holbert (born January 9, 1973) is an American former professional baseball infielder for the St. Louis Cardinals and Cincinnati Reds of Major League Baseball (MLB).

Playing career
He was promoted from the Triple-A Louisville Bats, the Cincinnati Reds' highest minor league team, on August 16, to replace Ryan Freel, who had been placed on the 15-day disabled list earlier that day. The gap of 9 years, 124 days between his first two games is the longest gap in Major League Baseball in the last 75 years.

In his career, he played at various levels in the organizations of the St. Louis Cardinals and Seattle Mariners before moving to the Reds' organization.

Post-playing career
In 2009, Holbert managed the Lake County Captains in the Cleveland Indians organization to a third-place finish in the Northern Division of the South Atlantic League. In December 2009, he was named the manager of the Indians' Carolina League affiliate Kinston Indians.

Holbert was named manager of the Yankees High-A minor league team, the Tampa Tarpons for the 2019 season.

References

External links

1973 births
Living people
African-American baseball players
American expatriate baseball players in Canada
Arizona League Cardinals players
Arkansas Travelers players
Baseball players from Torrance, California
Calgary Cannons players
Cincinnati Reds players
Durham Bulls players
Johnson City Cardinals players
Kinston Indians players
Lake County Captains managers
Louisville Bats players
Louisville Redbirds players
Major League Baseball infielders
Mayos de Navojoa players
Nashville Sounds players
New York Yankees scouts
Orlando Rays players
Pawtucket Red Sox players
Savannah Cardinals players
Springfield Cardinals players
St. Louis Cardinals players
St. Petersburg Cardinals players
Syracuse SkyChiefs players
Tacoma Rainiers players
American expatriate baseball players in Mexico
21st-century African-American sportspeople
20th-century African-American sportspeople